Dmitry Bankovsky (born January 10, 1968 in Svietlahorsk, Byelorussian SSR) is a Soviet sprint canoer who competed in the late 1980s and early 1990s. He won a gold medal in the K-4 10000 m event at the 1990 ICF Canoe Sprint World Championships in Poznań.

Bankovsky also finished fourth in the K-1 1000 m event at the 1988 Summer Olympics in Seoul.

References

1968 births
Canoeists at the 1988 Summer Olympics
Living people
People from Svietlahorsk District
Olympic canoeists of the Soviet Union
Soviet male canoeists
Belarusian  male canoeists
ICF Canoe Sprint World Championships medalists in kayak
Sportspeople from Gomel Region